Redan may refer to:

Redan, a fortification work in a V-shaped salient angled toward an expected attack
Battle of the Great Redan, a major battle during the Siege of Sevastopol in the Crimean War
Redan hole, a golf hole with a sloping, "v" shaped green, named after the fortification
Redan, Georgia, a town in the United States
Redan High School
Redan, Victoria, a suburb in Australia
 A hamlet in Inkerman, Renfrewshire
 A community in Elizabethtown-Kitley, Ontario Township in Ontario, Canada
 Iwan Redan, Dutch footballer
 PMC Redan, Russian subculture, called destructive group by the Russian government